Karin Victoria Silvstedt (born 19 September 1974) is a Swedish model, actress, singer, and television personality.

Early life
Born in Skelleftehamn, Sweden, Silvstedt was raised in a family of five in Bollnäs, having one older sister and one younger brother. She was keen on horseback riding and wanted to become a veterinarian.

Silvstedt's father was the captain of a local ski team, and she started alpine skiing at the age of five. In 1989, Silvstedt placed fourth at the Swedish national alpine skiing youth championship, in the giant slalom event won by Pernilla Wiberg. However, an accident in the middle of a skiing competition where she injured her shoulder ended Silvstedt's competitive skiing career at the age of 16.

A few years later, Silvstedt was invited to participate in the Miss Sweden beauty pageant, after her mother and sister had sent some pictures of her to the pageant officials.

Career

Modeling
Silvstedt participated in the Miss Sweden beauty pageant, and she was chosen to represent her country in the 1993 Miss World pageant in Sun City, South Africa, eventually making the Top 10. Silvstedt was signed up by a modeling agency in Paris, and she started working for various prestigious fashion houses, including Chanel, Christian Dior, Giorgio Armani, Givenchy, Loris Azzaro, and Valentino, appearing in advertisements and fashion shows. While living in Paris, she shared a flat with Melania Trump.

Silvstedt was soon noticed by Hugh Hefner, who invited her to do a photo shoot for Playboy magazine in Los Angeles. She became the December 1996 Playmate of the Month, and was then chosen as the 1997 Playmate of the Year. Silvstedt has since appeared in various Playboy magazines, including Playboy Special Editions, as well as Playboy Videos. In the late 1990s, Silvstedt landed one of the most sought-after modeling contracts in the world, becoming the Guess? spokesmodel, succeeding among others Claudia Schiffer and Anna Nicole Smith.

In the 2000s and 2010s, Silvstedt has continued modeling internationally, appearing in numerous magazines, including FHM, Glamour, GQ, Hello!, Maxim and Vanity Fair, working for various brands such as Lynx, Nike, Renault and Triumph International, and being the cover star for the re-issued Russ Meyer DVDs.

She has been featured on over 500 magazine covers.

Acting
Silvstedt has worked as an actress since the late 1990s, when she appeared in Hollywood television series such as Malibu, CA and Melrose Place. Since then, Silvstedt has also appeared in a number of Hollywood comedy films, including BASEketball, The Independent, Out Cold, and Boat Trip. Silvstedt has also appeared as a guest actress on Ocean Ave., a Miami-based soap opera, broadcast in Sweden and Florida.

Silvstedt has also starred in films and television series in various European countries, especially in Italy. As a leading actress, she has appeared in Italian films such as La mia vita a stelle e strisce and Un maresciallo in gondola, in which she played Kim Novak. She has also had supporting roles in films like Un'estate al mare and Matrimonio alle Bahamas. In 2010, Silvstedt starred in Just for the Record, a British mockumentary, starring also Steven Berkoff among others (Tagline: "They made the worst film of all time... let the trial begin"). She also had a small role in the French film Heartbreaker, starring Romain Duris and Vanessa Paradis.

As for theatre, Silvstedt has appeared in the Off Broadway production, Pieces (of Ass), during its run in Los Angeles in 2004.

Presenting
Silvstedt has been presenting numerous television shows and television specials all around the world since the 1990s. She has hosted entertainment shows such as Candid Camera on CBS, Eurotrash on Channel 4, and Wild On! on E!, and appeared as a presenter in various awards shows, including NRJ and World Music Awards. She has also served as a celebrity judge on Project Catwalk, the British reality television series focusing on fashion design.

In 2006, Silvstedt started working as a hostess of La Roue de la Fortune in France and La Ruota Della Fortuna in Italy. Both of the shows are based on the popular American game show Wheel of Fortune, and Silvstedt divided her time between Paris and Rome, filming one of the shows for one month at a time, until 2009, when the Italian version was cancelled. As of 2012, Silvsted is no longer part of the French version either.

In 2010, Silvstedt hosted her own television show Sport by Victoria on Eurosport during the 2010 Winter Olympics. The light-hearted programme introduced different winter sports, and it was done both in English and French.

Since 2011, Silvstedt has also hosted numerous Le grand bêtisier television specials on TF1 in France, including the Christmas special Le grand bêtisier de Noël, which attracted over three million viewers and an audience share of 32.7 percent on Christmas Eve 2011.

Singing
Silvstedt released her dance music album Girl on the Run through the EMI label in 1999. Three singles, "Hello Hey", "Rocksteady Love", and "Party Line", were also released to support the album sales, and the album went gold in Sweden. In 2010, Silvstedt released her fourth single called "Saturday Night", a Whigfield cover.

Silvstedt has said she loves singing, but it is just a hobby, and that she cannot see herself making a full-time career out of it.

Designing
Having an interest in fashion design, Silvstedt launched her own lingerie collection Very Victoria Silvstedt at London Fashion Week in 2006. The Very Victoria Silvstedt brand was then officially launched for retail in collaboration with the Marie Meili brand in Paris in 2013.

Reality TV
Silvstedt debuted with her own reality television series Victoria Silvstedt: My Perfect Life on E! in 2008. The show has since been aired all around the world, including Europe, Asia, Australia, and the Americas.

The first season covers Silvstedt's personal and work life, following her to St. Tropez, Monaco, Cannes, Paris, Rome, London, Helsinki, Stockholm, Los Angeles, and New York City. Silvstedt also visits her family in Northern Sweden, where she grew up, spending time with her childhood friends, horseback riding et cetera.

In 2016, Silvstedt participated in the Swedish reality series Stjärnorna på godset alongside some of Sweden's best known reality series stars such as Meral Tasbas, Qristina Ribohn and Robban Andersson. The series was broadcast on TV3.

Autobiography
Silvstedt published her autobiography Les Secrets de Victoria. Dans la Tête de Victoria Silvstedt (Jean-Claude Gawsewitch Éditeur), co-written with journalist Christelle Crosnier, in France in 2010.

Personal life
Silvstedt met Chris Wragge in 1999, when he interviewed her for Entertainment Tonight. They were married in June 2000, and divorced in 2009.

According to the Finnish broadsheet newspaper Keskisuomalainen, Silvstedt earns millions of dollars every year for her work in modeling, television presenting, and promoting various brands and products.

Silvstedt speaks English, French, and Italian, in addition to her native language Swedish.

Discography

Albums
 1999: Girl on the Run

Singles
(From "Girl on the Run")
 1999: "Hello Hey"
 1999: "Rocksteady Love" (feat. Turbo B.)
 2000: "Party Line" (Promo only)
 2010: "Saturday Night"

References

External links

1974 births
Living people
People from Skellefteå Municipality
People from Bollnäs
Miss World 1993 delegates
1990s Playboy Playmates
Playboy Playmates of the Year
Swedish film actresses
Swedish television actresses
Swedish voice actresses
Swedish socialites
Swedish female models
Swedish autobiographers
Women autobiographers
Swedish beauty pageant winners
21st-century Swedish singers
21st-century Swedish women singers
20th-century Swedish women